Ioane is a given name. Notable people with the name include:

Georgian name for Given name John
Saint John the Iberian, a Georgian monk
Ioane Bagrationi (Georgian: იოანე ბაგრატიონი) (1768–1830), Georgian prince (batonishvili), writer and encyclopedist
Ioane Petritsi (Georgian: იოანე პეტრიწი), Georgian Neoplatonic philosopher of the 11th or 12th century
Ioane Shavteli (Georgian: იოანე შავთელი), Georgian poet of the late 12th and early 13th centuries
Ioane-Zosime (Georgian: იოანე-ზოსიმე), the 10th century Georgian Christian monk and religious writer known for liturgical compilations and hymns
Surname
Akira Ioane (born 1995), New Zealand rugby union footballer
Digby Ioane (born 1985), Australian rugby union footballer
Eddie Ioane (born 1966), Samoan rugby union footballer
Jason Ioane, fictional character from the TV series Baywatch Hawaii
Junior Ioane (born 1977), American football defensive tackle in the National Football League
Kete Ioane (born 1950), Cook Islands politician and former Cabinet Minister
Moana Ioane, Cook Islands politician and member of the Cook Islands Parliament
Monty Ioane (born 1994), Australian-born rugby union footballer for Italy
Rieko Ioane (born 1997), New Zealand rugby union footballer